Dale Lee Mortensen (October 14, 1966 – January 29, 2020) was an American politician. A Republican, he served in the Montana House of Representatives from 2015 until his death in 2020. A graduate of Montana State University, he lived in Billings, Montana. He served in the police and sheriff's offices as a law enforcement officer. Mortensen owned and operated a private investigation business. He was a field representative for Montana Congressman Denny Rehberg. Mortensen died on January 29, 2020, in Billings and was 53 years old.

Notes

1966 births
2020 deaths
Politicians from Billings, Montana
Politicians from Helena, Montana
Montana State University alumni
American police officers
Businesspeople from Montana
Republican Party members of the Montana House of Representatives
21st-century American politicians
21st-century American businesspeople